Kostecki Brothers Racing is an Australian motor racing team which is currently competing in the Dunlop Super2 Series. The team enters a Holden VF Commodore for Kurt Kostecki. The team was formed in 2015 to run a car in the Kumho Tyre Series for Jake Kostecki

Super 2 Series 
For 2016 the team debuted in the Dunlop Super 2 Series, entering a pair of VF Commodores built by Triple Eight Race Engineering for brothers Jake & Kurt Kostecki. Both drivers struggled all season with Kurt finishing 16th in the championship after missing the Townsville round due to his Supercars Championship debut with Team 18. Jake meanwhile would finish 18th in the series standings, with a best finish of 11th, achieved at Sandown and Homebush.

The team would continue with the same cars and driver lineup for the 2017 Dunlop Super 2 Series. Kurt would have a better year, finishing inside the top 10 ten times on his way to 9th in the standings. Jake would have a difficult year, taking only 3 top tens and missing the final round in Newcastle to finish 22nd in the championship

For 2018 the team would add Brodie Kostecki, cousin of Jake and Kurt in a 3rd VF Commodore. Brodie would finish the highest of the three, taking 3 wins, including his first 2 wins to sweep the round at Sandown as well as 3 other podiums, finishing 5th in the championship. Kurt would secure his first podium in the series at Adelaide, taking 2 other podiums to finish 8th in the championship. Jake would struggle again, his best result being a pair of 6th places at Sandown. He would finish in 18th.

2019 would see Jake and Brodie stay with the team, with Kurt taking his car to Triple Eight Race Engineering. Brodie would win the second race at Adelaide and finish 2nd in the third. He would score decent results at Barbagallo, before withdrawing from the season to concentrate on the teams endurance series campaign. Jake would also achieve solid results, withdrawing from the series after the Queensland round to focus on the teams endurance series campaign. 

For 2020 the team would downsize again, Kurt would bring his car back to the family team with the intention to compete in the whole series. However due to the 2020 Coronavirus Pandemic, he would withdraw from the series after the first round in Adelaide.

Supercars Championship 
Kostecki Brothers Racing would make their Supercars Championship Debut as a wildcard at the 2018 Ipswich SuperSprint, entering Kurt Kostecki in his Super 2 VF Commodore. Kurt would also enter The Bend Supersprint event as a wildcard, achieving modest results. He would finish 53rd, and last in the championship, being the only driver to compete in only 2 events.

For the 2019 Pirtek Enduro Cup, the team would enter a ZB Commodore as a wildcard for all 3 events for Jake & Brodie Kostecki. They would retire from the Bathurst 1000 after crashing out at Reid Park towards the end of the race. The team would fare better at Surfers Paradise, finishing 18th and 16th in the two races. They would achieve their best result at Sandown, with Brodie finishing 8th in his qualifying race, with the pair going on to finish 16th in the feature race.

Kumho Tyre Series
Kostecki Brothers Racing was formed in 2015, Entering an ex-Triple Eight Race Engineering BF Falcon for Jake Kostecki, the team was entered under the name of sponsors Arcoplate & Penrite Oils. Kostecki competed in rounds 1 through 4, achieving modest results and finishing 9th in the championship, despite missing a round.

Results

Australian V8 Touring Car

Super 2

Supercars

Drivers

Supercars Drivers

Super2 Drivers

Super3 Drivers
 Jake Kostecki (2015)

References

Supercars Championship teams
Australian auto racing teams
Auto racing teams established in 2015